Gabriel Viratelle (13 June 1910 – 2 May 1971) was a French racing cyclist. He rode in the 1934 Tour de France.

References

1910 births
1971 deaths
French male cyclists
Place of birth missing